Serge Geoffrion (born May 2, 1955) is a Quebec politician and journalist. He served as the member for La Prairie in the Quebec National Assembly as a member of the Parti Québécois from 1998 until 2003.

Biography
Geoffrion attended the Université Laval, where he obtained a bachelor's degree in political science and minored in journalism. He returned to Canada as a journalist for Le Peuple de Lévis and worked as an assistant lecturer in the Department of Journalism at Université Laval in 1983. Geoffrion then became editor of Les Nouvelles de Saint-Laurent in 1986 and 1987, and subsequently editor-in-chief of the newspaper L'Événement de Saint-Constant from 1988 until 1989.

Political career

Geoffrion worked as Director of Communications for the Parti Québécois de Lévis in 1985. He was responsible for communications for the no committee in La Prairie during the 1992 referendum on the Charlottetown Accord and for the yes committee in La Prairie for the 1995 Quebec Referendum. He then worked as Director of Communications for the Parti Quebecois in La Prairie for two elections.

During this time Geoffrion was an aide to Denis Lazure and then his successor Monique Simard. Simard did not run for re-election in 1998. Geoffrion ran as her successor 1998, and won easily. He sought re-election in 2003 and lost his seat to Liberal Jean Dubuc by 937 votes.

Since his departure from office he has worked as an aide to Maka Kotto as both a Member of Parliament and a Member of the National Assembly.

Electoral record

Provincial

References 

1955 births
Living people
Canadian newspaper editors
Canadian newspaper journalists
Canadian male journalists
Canadian political consultants
Canadian public relations people
Journalists from Montreal
Parti Québécois MNAs
Politicians from Montreal
Université Laval alumni
Academic staff of Université Laval
20th-century Canadian politicians
21st-century Canadian politicians